Gene HEPACAM*, named based on its original site of identification - hepatocytes and the nature of its protein product - a cell adhesion molecule (CAM), was first discovered and characterised in human liver and reported by Shali Shen (MD, PhD) in 2005. The gene encodes a protein of 416 amino acids, designated as hepaCAM**, which is a new member of the immunoglobulin superfamily of cell adhesion molecules (IgSF CAM). The main biological functions of hepaCAM include a) modulating cell-matrix adhesion and migration, and b) inhibiting cancer cell growth.

(Note: *HEPACAM, gene name; **hepaCAM, protein name)

Discovery

Through differential screening of gene expression, over 200 genes were found to be either up- or down-regulated in a hepatocellular carcinoma patient. These genes were subsequently evaluated against a panel of human HCC specimens, leading to the identification of a novel gene HEPN1. Based on the sequence of HEPN1, the new gene HEPACAM was then isolated and characterised.

Characteristics and functions

Structurally, hepaCAM is a glycoprotein containing an extracellular domain with 2 Ig-like loops, a transmembrane region and a cytoplasmic domain. Matched to chromosome 11q24, gene HEPACAM is ubiquitously expressed in normal human tissues, with particularly high expression levels in the central nervous system (CNS), and is frequently suppressed in a variety of tumour types. Functionally, hepaCAM is involved in cell-extracellular matrix interactions and growth control of cancer cells, and is able to induce differentiation of glioblastoma cells. In cell signaling, hepaCAM directly interacts with F-actin and calveolin 1, and is capable of inducing senescence-like growth arrest via a p53/p21-dependent pathway. Moreover, hepaCAM is proteolytically cleaved near the transmemberane region. These findings indicate that the new Ig-like cell adhesion molecule hepaCAM is also a tumour suppressor.

Other names
glialCAM, which was cloned from a human brain cDNA library in 2008 and found to be identical to hepaCAM; and
HEPACAM1, when HEPACAM2 emerged in 2010.

About HEPACAM 2
Metastatic canine mammary carcinoma and their metastases are characterized by decreased HEPACAM2 but unchanged HEPACAM2 expression levels when compared to normal glands.

References

Breast cancer
Immunoglobulin superfamily
Tumor suppressor genes